Crissay-sur-Manse is a commune in the Indre-et-Loire department in central France. It is one of the 'most beautiful villages of France' (an official category). The houses are made from white limestone, with mullioned windows. The village is located on the Manse river.

Population

Amenities
In 2010 it contained two restaurants. There are walking trails and picnic areas signposted in the town.

See also
Communes of the Indre-et-Loire department

References

Communes of Indre-et-Loire
Plus Beaux Villages de France